Stockton, California, held an election for mayor on June 5, 2012 and November 6, 2012. It saw Anthony Silva unseat incumbent mayor Ann Johnston.

Municipal elections in California are officially non-partisan.

Results

First round

Runoff

References 

Stockton
Mayoral elections in Stockton, California
Stockton, California